Mephritus destitutus is a species of beetle in the family Cerambycidae. It was described by Napp and Martins in 1982.

References

Elaphidiini
Beetles described in 1982